Transonic is the debut album by American jazz drummer Whit Dickey, which was recorded in 1997 and released on AUM Fidelity. For his first record as leader, Dickey went into the studio with long-time associate, saxophonist Rob Brown, and then relative newcomer to the scene, bassist Chris Lightcap. He notes that many of the cuts were inspired by two Thelonious Monk compositions, "Off Minor" & "Criss Cross", along with the magic of tenor saxophonist David S. Ware.

Reception

In his review for AllMusic, Hank Shteamer states that the album "features memorable writing, inspired performances, and a lush recording quality." The Penguin Guide to Jazz says that "Transonic its flaring and exciting trio free-jazz, much of it played at full tilt, yet never so chaotically noisy that you feel the players are blowing just for the hell of it."

The album was voted #3 in the Cadence Magazine Readers Poll for Top Records of 1998.

Track listing
All compositions by Whit Dickey except as indicated
 "Planet One" – 4:50
 "Penumbra" – 6:19
 "Transonic" – 9:16 
 "Second Skin" (Dickey/Brown/Lightcap) – 8:02
 "Volleys" – 5:45 
 "Tableau" – 5:11
 "Kinesis" (Dickey/Brown/Lightcap) – 3:36
 "Skyhook" – 9:37

Personnel
Whit Dickey – drums
Rob Brown – alto sax, flute
Chris Lightcap – bass

References

1998 debut albums
Whit Dickey albums
AUM Fidelity albums